The 2017 Southern Jaguars football team represented Southern University in the 2017 NCAA Division I FCS football season. The Jaguars were led by fifth-year head coach Dawson Odums and played their home games at Ace W. Mumford Stadium in Baton Rouge, Louisiana as members of the West Division of the Southwestern Athletic Conference (SWAC). They finished the season 7–4, 5–2 in SWAC play to finish in second place in the West Division.

Due to NCAA APR violations, the Jaguars were ineligible to participate in the SWAC Championship or the Celebration Bowl.

Preseason 
The Jaguars were picked to finish in second place in the Western Division.

Schedule

Schedule Source:

References

Southern
Southern Jaguars football seasons
Southern Jaguars football